Copturomorpha is a genus of true weevils in the beetle family Curculionidae. There are more than 20 described species in Copturomorpha, found in North, Central, and South America.

Species
These 24 species belong to the genus Copturomorpha:

 Copturomorpha 11-notata Champion, 1906
 Copturomorpha albomaculatus Champion, 1906
 Copturomorpha albosignatus Champion, 1906
 Copturomorpha brevicornis Hustache, 1938
 Copturomorpha diffusa Hustache, 1938
 Copturomorpha dispersa Hustache, 1938
 Copturomorpha episternalis Hustache, 1938
 Copturomorpha fulva Hustache, 1938
 Copturomorpha funerea Champion, 1906
 Copturomorpha interrupta Champion, 1906
 Copturomorpha leucosticta Champion, 1906
 Copturomorpha musica Champion, 1906
 Copturomorpha mutica Hustache, 1938
 Copturomorpha nigricornis Hustache, 1938
 Copturomorpha nigrobasalis Hustache, 1938
 Copturomorpha oblongula Hustache, 1938
 Copturomorpha obscura Hustache, 1938
 Copturomorpha ochracea Hustache, 1938
 Copturomorpha ornata Hustache, 1938
 Copturomorpha rileyi New
 Copturomorpha rugipennis Champion, 1906
 Copturomorpha seriata Hustache, 1938
 Copturomorpha signatella Hustache, 1938
 Copturomorpha variegata Hustache, 1938

References

Further reading

 
 
 

Weevils